Léonard Baraka (born 24 February 1985) is a retired Malagasy football defender.

References

1985 births
Living people
Malagasy footballers
Madagascar international footballers
Ecoredipharm players
AS Adema players
AS Fortior players
Association football defenders